Morning Sun is the 2002 EP from Australian three-piece band The Beautiful Girls.
This was the debut album, an independent release, distributed by MGM Distribution.

Track listing
 "Periscopes" - 3:33
 "All I Need" - 2:40
 "Morning Sun" - 4:55
 "The Reason Is" - 4:14
 "Version" - 2:12
 "Big Mama's Door" - 3:44
 "On A Clear Day" - 6:21
 "A Million Miles" - 3:13

The Single "Morning Sun" was also featured on a mountain biking film called "Roam" which was produced by The Collective.

Personnel
Mat McHugh – vocals and guitar
Mitch Connelly – drums and percussion
Clay MacDonald – bass, vocals, xylophone and recorder

2002 debut EPs
The Beautiful Girls albums